The Manuel Piar Hydroelectric Power Plant (Tocoma Dam) is a stalled hydroelectric development project in the Lower Caroní River Basin of Venezuela. As of 2019, the project is unfinished. 

The project was awarded to OIV consortium, consisting of Odebrecht (50%), Salini Impregilo (40%) and Vinccler (10%), with an initial budget US$3,061 mil. These units had the world record as of 2012 in power generation at nominal head for Kaplan turbines.

The first generator was installed but not yet commissioned in April 2012. Behind schedule, the dam began to impound its reservoir on 16 November 2015. The budget tripled to $9,4 billion in 2017, as of 2019 the project is still unfinished. Odebrecht spent between 2007 and 2015 at least $118 million on bribes related to the project.

References

Dams under construction
Hydroelectric power stations in Venezuela
Dams in Venezuela